Asebu (also known as Sabou) was a former Fante chiefdom and town in the Abura/Asebu/Kwamankese District, Central Region, Ghana. In the history of the Gold Coast, Asebu is notable for being the first Fante chiefdom to sign a treaty with the Dutch Republic in 1612. The treaty allowed the Dutch to establish Fort Nassau at Mouri, now known as Moree.

Asebu Amanfi also known as The Giant of Asebu was a Warrior King and the founder of Asebu Kingdom in the Central Region of Ghana.

Places of interest
Moree Beach Resort
Sculptures at Fufumpowmu
Ruins of Fort Nassau at Moree which was built by the Dutch in the 17th century.

Festivals
Apayam is celebrated in all settlements. Its main features are remembrance of the dead and the training of the youth to defend the towns, using toy guns fashioned from bamboo branches and bullets from ‘abrober’ seeds.

Apayamkese festival is aimed at uniting all the people of the traditional area and also to take stock of their activities in the past year. Apayamkese festival is a new observance initiated by the reigning paramount chief. In 2010, the festival will run from 14 to 21 November in Asebu.

'Kae Ako' Festival is also celebrated in the northern parts of the traditional area. It is observed with Asafo drumming and musketry to remember a past hero (Ako) who gave his life to save the Asebus. It assures the people of their capability to defend themselves should they be attacked.

Citations

References
 

Populated places in the Central Region (Ghana)